Chant is an album by American trumpeter Donald Byrd recorded in 1961 but not released on the Blue Note label until 1979.

Reception
Allmusic awarded the album 4 stars and the review by Scott Yanow states, "This is superior hard bop from the early '60s".

Track listing
 "I'm an Old Cowhand from the Rio Grande" (Johnny Mercer) – 7:39
 "You're Next" (Donald Byrd) – 7:25
 "Chant" (Duke Pearson) – 8:50
 "That's All" (Alan Brandt, Bob Haymes) – 9:33
 "Great God" (Byrd) – 6:58
 "Sophisticated Lady" (Duke Ellington, Irving Mills, Mitchell Parish) – 4:32

Personnel
Donald Byrd – trumpet (tracks 1–5)
Pepper Adams – baritone saxophone
Herbie Hancock – piano
Doug Watkins – bass
Teddy Robinson – drums ("Eddy" on album cover)

References

1979 albums
Albums recorded at Van Gelder Studio
Blue Note Records albums
Donald Byrd albums
Albums produced by Alfred Lion